Apoorva Lakhia is an Indian film director.

Early life
Lakhia was born and brought up in Ahmedabad, India. He was educated at the Lawrence School, Sanawar. He dropped out of a filmmaking course in New York University to assist Mira Nair on The Perez Family. He had been an assistant on American films such as The Ice Storm, A Perfect Murder and Addicted to Love.

Career
Before becoming a film director, Apoorva was an assistant director for Ashutosh Gowariker's period epic film Lagaan: Once Upon a Time in India. As Aamir Khan was looking for someone with Hollywood experience for Lagaan, Farhan Akhtar recommended Apoorva, who had worked with casts and crews in Hollywood. He also worked as the second assistant director for the film Kama Sutra: A Tale of Love (1996).

He made his debut as a film director with the 2002 film Mumbai Se Aaya Mera Dost. His second film Ek Ajnabee released in 2005 which starred Amitabh Bachchan and Arjun Rampal in the leading role was a remake of the 2004 American film Man on Fire. His third film Shootout at Lokhandwala which has a multi-star cast released on 25 May 2007 and was based on real-life events involving the underworld gangsters Maya Dolas and Dilip Buwa. In late 2007 he directed a short story titled Sex on the Beach for the anthology film Dus Kahaniyaan. His next film was Mission Istanbul starring Vivek Oberoi, Sunil Shetty, Shriya Saran and Zayed Khan which released in 2008. North American producer Vikas Kohli of Fatlabs studio collaborated with Mika Singh for the first time on the Mission Istaanbul soundtrack.

He has written the story of Hide & Seek (2009), which is directed Shawn Aranha. Lakhia wrote and directed all the movies from his debut to Mission Istanbul. He made his acting debut with a negative role in the 2010 film Knock Out starring Sanjay Dutt and Irrfan Khan.

In 2013, he directed a remake of the breakthrough film Zanjeer with Telugu actor Ram Charan; the film was funded by Aaditya Kulshreshtha. In 2017, he directed the film Haseena Parkar based on the life of Dawood Ibrahim's sister with Shraddha Kapoor and her real-life brother Siddhant Kapoor in the lead roles.

Filmography

References

External links

 
 imdb Cast/Crew

Film directors from Gujarat
Hindi-language film directors
Living people
Lawrence School, Sanawar alumni
Artists from Ahmedabad
21st-century Indian film directors
Year of birth missing (living people)